Georgi Stoev (September 26, 1973 – April 7, 2008, Sofia) was a Bulgarian writer and former Bulgarian mafia mobster.

Biography
As a teenager he trained to be a wrestler and attended  "Olympic Hopes" school in Sofia. With the collapse of one-party rule in 1989 the school was closed and the wrestlers formed a mafia which terrorized Bulgaria in the 1990s. Sometime later, Stoev turned away from crime and repented and turned to writing.

In his books, which totalled nine by his death, he revealed the secrets to some of the country's most notorious crimes based on his own experiences. He exposed alleged mafia gang members in his books, making no attempt to disguise their identities.

He was murdered by what is believed to be the mafia hit on April 7, 2008. He was shot three times in the street in Sofia. He had a seven-year-old daughter at the time of his death.

In the last third book of his trilogy BG Кръстника 3 (The Bg Godfather 3) he claims that the person on the top of the pyramid, the architect of the Bulgarian mob is actually general Liuben Gotsev (Liuben Gotzev) - a former Minister of Foreign Affairs, Minister of Interior and Communist Party member. In his scandalous book he writes that one of the most notorious gangsters from SIC (which was one of the major crime structures in Bulgaria during the "transition period"—the 1990s) Mladen Mihalev - Majo, had sexual relationship with Gotsev, and he suggests that is one of the main reasons why Majo was given such a big share from the illegal activities in the underworld. He also writes that prime minister  Boyko Borisov was a recruit of the Bulgarian mafia, at the time he was the general secretary of the ministry of interior.

See also
List of unsolved murders

References

External links
THE NATION - Chronicle of a Death Foretold: Georgi Stoev's Gangster Pulp
BBC News - Bulgarian crime writer shot dead

1973 births
2008 deaths
Deaths by firearm in Bulgaria
Male murder victims
Murdered Bulgarian gangsters
Organized crime writers
Unsolved murders in Bulgaria
Writers from Sofia
2008 murders in Bulgaria